is a passenger railway station located in the city of Sayama, Saitama, Japan, operated by the private railway operator Seibu Railway.

Lines

Station layout
This station consists of two opposed side platforms serving two tracks, connected to each other by a footbridge.

History
Iriso Station opened on 21 March 1953.

Station numbering was introduced on all Seibu Railway lines during fiscal 2012, with Iriso Station becoming "SS25".

Passenger statistics
In fiscal 2019, the station was the 56th busiest on the Seibu network with an average of 17,764 passengers daily.

The passenger figures for previous years are as shown below. Moovit provides free maps and live directions to help you navigate through your city. View schedules, routes, timetables, and find out how long does it take to get to Iriso Station (SS25) (入曽駅) in real time.

Surrounding area
Iriso Post Office
Minami-Iriso rail yard

References

External links

 Iriso Station information 

Railway stations in Saitama Prefecture
Railway stations in Japan opened in 1953
Stations of Seibu Railway
Sayama